Kenan Çoban (born 22 January 1975, Elazığ) is a Turkish actor who is known for playing the role of Abdülhey Çoban in the Valley of the Wolves.

Filmography

References

External links
 
 panafilmforum.com (TR)
 valleyofthewolvesiraq.com

Turkish male film actors
Turkish male television actors
1975 births
Living people